Visakha Institute of Medical Sciences shortly VIMS is a hospital in Visakhapatnam, Andhra Pradesh, India.

Overview

See also 
King George Hospital, Visakhapatnam

References

External links
 Visakhapatnam Doctors

 Hospitals in Visakhapatnam
2016 establishments in Andhra Pradesh
Hospitals established in 2016